Cookson is a community in the Cookson Hills of Cherokee County, Oklahoma, United States. The post office opened April 11, 1895. The ZIP Code is 74427. It is said to have been named for the first postmaster, John H. Cookson.

Demographics

Notable people
Professional fisherman and television host Jimmy Houston
The Ballew family still stands to be the majority residing family in the town of Cookson (and its surrounding areas).

Professional Visual Effect Artist Jason Hesley and Animation Studio Creative By Habit, Inc.
Professional fisherman Jared Miller

Notes

Sources
Shirk, George H. Oklahoma Place Names. Norman: University of Oklahoma Press, 1987.  .

Unincorporated communities in Cherokee County, Oklahoma
Unincorporated communities in Oklahoma